"Loving Arms" is a song written by Tom Jans and first recorded and released by Kris Kristofferson and Rita Coolidge as a duet in 1973 on their album Full Moon.

It was covered by Dobie Gray shortly after, and then by a number of artists the following year including Elvis Presley, Petula Clark and Jody Miller. Millie Jackson and Olivia Newton-John also covered the song in 1975.

History 
"Loving Arms" was written by Tom Jans. Jans recorded the song and released his version on his 1974 self-titled album.

Dobie Gray's version of the song peaked at number 61 on the Billboard Hot 100 for the week of October 6, 1973.

Kris Kristofferson and Rita Coolidge's version was released as a single in late 1973, and became a minor Billboard Hot 100 hit in the spring of 1974. The song first appeared on their 1973 duet album Full Moon.

Elvis Presley's version was first released on his 1974 album Good Times. In 1975, it was included as a B-side on some editions of his "My Boy" single. In 1981, it appeared on Presley's posthumous album Guitar Man and was released as the second single from it, with "You Asked Me To" on side B. In the UK, the song spent 6 weeks on the UK Singles Chart, peaking at number 47 for the week of April 14. In the United States, the single charted as a double A-side ("Lovin' Arms"/"You Asked Me To") on the Billboard Hot Country Singles chart, peaking at number 8 on the week of June 20.

Petula Clark's version reached number 9 on the Canadian AC/Pop charts, February 1, 1975.

In March 1977, the song was used in an episode of the TV show Starsky and Hutch (season 2, "Long Walk Down a Short Dirt Road") when David Soul as "Hutch" performed it with guest star Lynn Anderson in the show's tag.

In total, the song has been covered over 50 times. Other notable covers include ones by Olivia Newton-John, Etta James and the Dixie Chicks. French singer and actor Johnny Hallyday covered it in French (under the title "J'ai pleuré sur ma guitare") on his 17th studio album Je t'aime, je t'aime, je t'aime (1974).

Personnel
Kris Kristofferson & Rita Coolidge – vocals
Sammy Creason – drums
Leland Sklar – bass
Jerry McGee – guitar, harmonica
Bobbye Hall – percussion
Randy Scruggs – guitar
Booker T. Jones – keyboards

Musical style and lyrics 
As Steven Blanton notes in his book The Songwriter's Toolkit: From Pen to Push Play, "[t]he song is written using the method of holding the title until the last line effectively."

Charts

Dobie Gray version

Kris Kristofferson & Rita Coolidge version

Elvis Presley version 

 * as "Lovin' Arms"/"You Asked Me To"

References 

1973 songs
1973 singles
1974 singles
1981 singles
A&M Records singles
RCA Records singles
Kris Kristofferson songs
Rita Coolidge songs
Dobie Gray songs
Elvis Presley songs
Jon English songs
The Chicks songs
Male–female vocal duets
Country ballads
Rock ballads
1970s ballads
Songs written by Tom Jans
Song recordings produced by Felton Jarvis